Altmünster (Central Bavarian: Oidmünsta), also known as Altmünster am Traunsee, is a market town located about 3 kilometres south of Gmunden in the Austrian state of Upper Austria, on the west shore of the Traunsee. Its economic base consists primarily of tourism, light industry, and as a bedroom community for people working in larger communities such as Gmunden and Vöcklabruck.

Population

International relations

Twin towns — Sister cities
Altmünster is twinned with:
 Düren, Germany 
 Hoegaarden, Belgium

Notable residents

Franz Stangl (1908-1971), Austrian-born Nazi SS concentration camp commandant

See also
Taferlklaussee

References

Cities and towns in Gmunden District